Eric Wagner (April 24, 1959 – August 22, 2021) was an American heavy metal singer, best known for his work with doom metal band Trouble.

Career
Wagner formed Trouble in 1979. He briefly left the band in the mid-1990s and formed Lid with guitarist Daniel Cavanagh, resulting in 1997's In the Mushroom. He also appeared on Dave Grohl's heavy metal side-project Probot in 2004 with the song "My Tortured Soul".

He rejoined Trouble in 2000, and recorded one more album with them, Simple Mind Condition (2007), before leaving the band once again in May 2008 to pursue other musical interests and projects.

Wagner had also been recording under the band name Blackfinger. He also formed The Skull, which features former Trouble bassist Ron Holzner.

Death
Wagner died from complications of COVID-19 in Las Vegas on August 22, 2021, at the age of 62. According to bassist Ron Holzner, Wagner refused to be vaccinated before his death because he was "generally opposed to institutionalized medicine". Wagner completed the solo album In the Lonely Light of Mourning before his death, to be released posthumously on Cruz Del Sur Music.

Discography

Solo albums
2022: In the Lonely Light of Mourning

Albums with Trouble
1984: Psalm 9
1985: The Skull
1987: Run to the Light
1990: Trouble
1992: Manic Frustration
1995: Plastic Green Head
2007: Simple Mind Condition

Albums with Lid
1997: In the Mushroom

Albums with Blackfinger
2014: Blackfinger
2017: When Colors Fade Away

Albums with The Skull 
 2014: For Those Which Are Asleep
 2018: The Endless Road Turns Dark

Guest appearances
2004: Probot – "My Tortured Soul" (vocals on one track)

References

External links
Official website 
 

1959 births
2021 deaths
American male singers
American heavy metal singers
American performers of Christian music
Trouble (band) members
Deaths from the COVID-19 pandemic in Nevada